Holiday City South is an unincorporated community and census-designated place (CDP) located within Berkeley Township, in Ocean County, New Jersey, United States. As of the 2010 United States Census, the CDP's population was 3,689.

Geography
According to the United States Census Bureau, the CDP had a total area of 1.983 square miles (5.136 km2), including 1.961 square miles (5.079 km2) of land and 0.022 square miles (0.057 km2) of water (1.10%).

Demographics

Census 2010

Census 2000
As of the 2000 United States Census there were 4,047 people, 2,385 households, and 1,411 families living in the CDP. The population density was 831.1/km2 (2,157.7/mi2). There were 2,470 housing units at an average density of 507.3/km2 (1,316.9/mi2). The racial makeup of the CDP was 94.27% White, 5.09% African American, 0.05% Native American, 0.15% Asian, 0.02% from other races, and 0.42% from two or more races. Hispanic or Latino of any race were 0.96% of the population.

There were 2,385 households, out of which 0.9% had children under the age of 18 living with them, 53.2% were married couples living together, 4.7% had a female householder with no husband present, and 40.8% were non-families. 38.6% of all households were made up of individuals, and 35.8% had someone living alone who was 65 years of age or older. The average household size was 1.70 and the average family size was 2.12.

In the CDP the population was spread out, with 1.6% under the age of 18, 0.8% from 18 to 24, 3.3% from 25 to 44, 10.3% from 45 to 64, and 84.0% who were 65 years of age or older. The median age was 74 years. For every 100 females, there were 73.0 males. For every 100 females age 18 and over, there were 72.6 males.

The median income for a household in the CDP was $25,733, and the median income for a family was $30,893. Males had a median income of $34,375 versus $26,250 for females. The per capita income for the CDP was $18,726. About 5.6% of families and 6.5% of the population were below the poverty line, including 29.8% of those under age 18 and 6.3% of those age 65 or over.

References

Berkeley Township, New Jersey
Census-designated places in Ocean County, New Jersey